Jijaji Chhat Parr Koii Hai is an Indian television horror comedy series that aired from 8 March 2021 to 10 September 2021 on Sony SAB. Produced by Edit II Production, it starred Hiba Nawab and Shubhashish Jha. The series was a spiritual sequel of the 2018 series Jijaji Chhat Per Hain.

Plot
Two families, the Sharmas and the Jindals live in a two-story mansion in Punjabi Bagh, whose ownership is claimed by both and are constantly at loggerheads. Mystery revolves around the mansion where an abandoned locked room is said to be haunted. The ghost, Chandraprabha, is a look-alike of her great-granddaughter, Connaught Place Sharma, known as CP.

In the midst of all the unlikely events happening in the mansion, Jitendra Jamvant Jindal, known as JiJaJi, plans to acquire the entire mansion by marrying CP but his plans often backfire because Chandraprabha does not want him and CP to bond. Despite her relentless efforts to keep Jijaji separated from CP, Jijaji starts falling for CP when she saves his life every time Chandraprabha tries to kill him. CP too starts falling for Jijaji seeing his caring and affectionate attitude towards her.

Jijaji decides to face the ghost himself to save the two families and his love, CP. Jijaji weakens Chandraprabha using Mayuri's enchanted powder and nail such that she remains entrapped in the abandoned room. However, before Jijaji leaves, Chandraprabha narrates to him how she killed her husband, Yuvaraj, and then killed herself, by jumping into the well because of the curse of the bangle. She also tells Jijaji that all daughters born in the family are bound by the same curse. Thus, Chandraprabha convinces Jijaji that whatever happened with her is also bound to happen with CP and asks him to keep CP away from marriage. In reality, Chandraprabha made up the story. Chandraprabha also warns Jijaji that if he discloses the curse to CP then the curse will affect her immediately. Jijaji having fallen truly and deeply in love with CP promises Chandraprabha that he will never marry CP nor allow her to marry anyone else to protect her from the curse.

Later, when Jijaji tries to distance himself from CP, the latter tries to woo him using all possible means. Soon, Jijaji falls prey to one of CP's plans and lets out that he too loves her but he disagrees to marry her. CP concludes that after overpowering the ghost, Jijaji's behaviour and affection towards her has changed. CP decides to learn the reason for Jijaji's changed behaviour, so, she dresses up as Chandraprabha and makes Jijaji reveal the truth about the curse.

After learning the truth, CP challenges Chandraprabha that hers and Jijaji's love is so strong that they can overcome any curse. CP soon learns that the person who has a symbol of a peacock on his/her body can remove the curse. She starts hunting for that person and it turns out to be her father, Jaldiram. It is also revealed that Chandraprabha too has her own selfish motives. In reality there was no curse. She wants to become immortal and the most powerful by entering CP's body and by possessing all evil forces. She had to sacrifice the most precious thing to her. Hence she sacrificed her husband and killed herself.

In the end, when Chandraprabha tries to use Jaldiram to win her intentions. Jijaji reaches there on time, saves Jaldiram and foils Chandraprabha's plans. Later, he overpowers her and pushes her into the haunted well. Both the families and Jaldiram appreciate Jijaji's heroism. Then, Jijaji proposes to CP and is accepted by both families.

In the final scene Chandraprabha leaves a suspense by saying, "Hum wapis aayenge".

Cast and characters

Main
 Hiba Nawab as
Connaught Place Sharma aka CP: Jaldiram and Sofia's daughter and Chandra Prabha's great-granddaughter. Jijaji's love interest. A free-spirited, smart and stubborn yet fun-loving girl who is eager to marry. She has a best friend named Titli. Her catchphrase is "Siyappe hain by God!". Initially, she regularly fought with Jijaji and also insulted the Jindals, later, she falls for Jijaji. (2021)
 Chandraprabha Sen: Yuvaraj's wife. Mysterious ghost who is the sister of CP's great-grandmother. She has haunted the mansion since her death. She wanted to possess CP on her 21st birthday and become immortal. She even sacrificed her husband for her evil motives. (2021)
 Shubhashish Jha as Jitendra Jamvant Jindal aka Jijaji: Nanhe and Bijli Devi's son. CP's love interest. He is a humorous, cultured and obedient auto-mechanic who owns a garage named "Jijaji Auto Works". Initially, he always fought with CP and insulted the Sharmas, later, he falls in love with CP. (2021)
 Anup Upadhyay as Jaldiram Sharma: Owner of Jaldiram Sweets, CP's father and Sophia's husband. He has a symbol of two peacocks on his head. He shares a love-hate relationship with Nanhe and often roasts the Jindals. He does not want any relationship to happen between Jijaji and CP. (2021)
 Soma Rathod as Sophia Sharma (née Bakshi): CP's mother and Jaldiram's wife who sometimes behaves weirdly. She shares a love-hate relationship with Bijli and often roasts the Jindals. (2021)
 Jitu Shivhare as Jamvant Jindal aka Nanhe: Jijaji's father, Bijli Devi's husband and Gulzar's step-father. He is lazy. He shares a love-hate relationship with Jaldiram and often roasts the Sharmas. (2021)
 Sucheta Khanna as Bijli Devi Jindal: Jijaji's mother, Nanhe's wife and Gulzar's step-mother. She is pretty yet silly and speaks broken English. She shares a love-hate relationship with Sofia and often roasts the Sharmas. (2021)
 Vipin Heero as Gulzar: Nanhe's and Bijli Devi's adopted son and Jijaji's best friend, he often roasts both the Sharmas and the Jindals. He wants to be a famous poet and often talks in poetic verses which annoys everyone. (2021)

Recurring
 Raashi Bawa as Titli: Manager intern at Jaldiram Sweets and CP's best friend. Bunty's love-interest. She has the habit of taking selfies with Cannought Place using different emotive poses. (2021)
 Saurabh Kaushik as Bunty: Waiter at Jaldiram Sweets. He has a crush on Titli. He once kidnapped Titli to impress her but was failed by Jijaji. (2021)
 Feroz Khan as Advocate Chakraal Bakshi: Sofia's brother. He fights the property suit for the Sharmas against the Jindals. (2021)
 Sumit Arora as Advocate Vigyanchand Arora: Son of Advocate Gyanchand. He fights the property suit for the Jindals against the Sharmas. (2021)
 Nagin Vadel as Advocate Gyanchand Arora: Father of Advocate Vigyanchand. He used to fight the property suit for Jindals before his son. Now, he is completely paralyzed and only accompanies his son on a wheelchair during the property dispute between the Jindals and the Sharmas. He says "yup" in unlikely situations. (2021)
 Soneer Vadhera as Inspector Gulati: SHO of Punjabi Bagh police station who is often involved in mishaps involving the Jindals and the Sharmas. He also investigates the murders and issues caused by Chandraprabha. He has the habit of kissing people when he is happy. (2021)
 Sohit Soni as Constable Rathee: Inspector Gulati's assistant who often stays around the Jindals and Sharmas because of their conflict. (2021)
Tannaz Irani as Mayuri: Jamvant and Jaldiram's college friend who has a piece of profound knowledge on ghosts and paranormal activities. She is more powerful than Chandraprabha but her soul was pushed into the haunted well by Chandraprabha, due to a mistake caused by Jamvant and Jaldiram. She has been comatose since then. (2021)
 Buneet Kapoor : Yuvaraj Sen: Chandraprabha's husband. He loves his wife, Chandraprabha. But, later he was killed by her for her evil intentions. (2021)
 Nitin Jhadav as Ghissu: Owner of Ghissu Ice Cream. He has a habit of asking questions to everyone. Basically, when CP and JIjaji was discussion about something.  (2021)

Production

Development
On 8 February 2021, Hiba Nawab confirmed returning to the second season of Jijaji Chhat Per Hain.

Casting
With the release of first promo, Hiba Nawab, Anup Upadhyay, Soma Rathod and Feroz Khan were confirmed returning to the series. Shubhashish Jha was cast to play the lead role. Raashi Bawa and Sumit Arora were also confirmed making comeback to the series. Besides Jitu Shivhare, Sucheta Khanna, Vipin Heero and Nagin Wadel were cast.

Release
The first promo of the series was released on 12 February 2021 featuring Hiba Nawab and Shubhashish Jha.

Broadcast
The series was put on hold for three months due to COVID-19 Lockdown in Maharashtra from 13 April 2021. In early June 2021, the government of Maharashtra permitted shooting within the state with certain restrictions and shooting of the series started on the sets abiding with the rules and restrictions set up by the government. The series then started airing its fresh episodes after a three-month break from 5 July 2021.

References

External links
 
 Jijaji Chhat Parr Koii Hai on Sony SAB

Hindi comedy shows
Hindi language television sitcoms
2021 Indian television series debuts
Indian television sitcoms
Sony SAB original programming
Television shows set in Delhi
2021 Indian television series endings